The  is a DC electric multiple unit (EMU) train type operated by the private railway operator Keikyu on commuter services in the Tokyo area of Japan since 2002.

Operations
The eight-car sets are primarily used on limited-stop "Rapid Limited Express" and "Limited Express" services on the Keikyu Main Line, including through-running services to the Toei Asakusa Line as well as the Keisei Oshiage Line, Keisei Main Line, and Hokuso Line. Some of these eight-car sets are also being used on the Keikyu Airport Line. Four-car sets are commonly used to form 12-car "Rapid Limited Express" and "Limited Express" services, and are also used singly on all-stations "Local" services; in addition, some are used on the Keikyu Daishi Line, with some being used to form eight-car trains for use on inter-running services to the Asakusa Line and Keisei lines. The six-car formations delivered from 2011 are generally used on all-stations "Local" services. The N1000 series sets can be used in multiple with other Keikyu EMU types, including the 600 series, 1500 series, 2000 series, and 2100 series.

Variants

Since the first set was introduced in 2002, the type has undergone a number of design improvements. Sets built from 2002 to 2006 have painted aluminium bodies, whereas sets built from 2007 onward (sets 1073 onward) have stainless steel bodies. More detailed variations are described below. The Siemens inverters fitted to the first two batches prior to their refurbishment between 2017 and 2021 were known in Japan by the nickname , due to the distinctive ascending musical scale the trains produced when accelerating from a standstill.

Batch 1
Delivered February to June 2002.
 8-car sets x 3: 1001, 1009, 1017
 4-car sets x 2: 1401, 1405

These sets have single-arm pantographs and were formerly equipped with roller-blind destination indicators and Siemens GTO variable-frequency drive (VVVF) traction equipment.

Batch 2
Delivered May to July 2003.
 8-car sets x 2: 1025, 1033
 4-car sets x 2: 1409, 1413

The centre pillars of the passenger windows were discontinued. 

Set 1409 was upgraded in May 2018, and modifications included LED lights, LCD-displays above the doors, LED-displays on the sides, and replacement of the original GTO-VVVF propulsion systems with IGBT inverters supplied by Toshiba, which is also used on sets 1401 and 1405 from the earlier batch. Set 1413 was also upgraded like set 1409 and started service in December 2018. Set 1025 was refurbished in May and August 2019, and the original Siemens GTO was changed to Toyo Denki IGBT. Set 1033 had Siemens GTO inverters until 18 July 2021, where it operated as a charter from Shinagawa; its last run ultimately took place on 20 July. Following refurbishment, set 1033 received Toyo Denki IGBT inverters.

Batch 3
Delivered January to March 2005.
 8-car sets x 2: 1041, 1049
 4-car sets x 2: 1417, 1421

Initially built with Siemens-manufactured IGBT-VVVF inverters.

Set 1417 was refurbished in March 2019. This set now has LED lighting, LCD-displays above the doors, other LED displays, and was refitted with Toyo Denki-manufactured IGBT-VVVF inverters. Both 1041 and 1049 were powered by Siemens IGBT-VVVF.

Batch 4
Delivered July to August 2005.
 8-car sets x 1: 1057
 4-car sets x 4: 1425, 1429, 1433, 1437

Feature full-colour LED destination indicators.

Batch 5
Delivered November 2006.
 8-car sets x 1: 1065
 4-car sets x 2: 1441, 1445

No design changes over 4th batch vehicles.

Set 1065 has refurbished and refitted with Toyo Denki IGBT-VVVF.

Batch 6
Delivered March 2007.
 8-car set x 1: 1073
Body design changed to unpainted stainless steel. The four-seat transverse bays at the ends of cars were replaced by longitudinal bench seats.

Starting this batch until batch 16, all 8-car trains use Mitsubishi IGBT-VVVF inverters.

Batch 7
Delivered January to February 2008.
 8-car sets x 2: 1081, 1089

Yellow warning tape was added around the door interiors.

Batch 8
Delivered September to December 2008.
 8-car sets x3: 1097, 1105, 1113
 4-car sets x2: 1449, 1453

Starting this batch until batch 20, all 4- and 6-car sets are powered by Toyo-Denki IGBT-VVVF unless noted.

Batch 9
Delivered April to June 2009.
 4-car sets x8: 1457, 1461, 1465, 1469, 1473, 1477, 1481, 1485

Batch 10
Delivered during fiscal 2010.
 8-car sets x 3: 1121, 1129, 1137
 4-car set x 1: 1489

Audible warnings added for door opening/closing, and pairs of LCD passenger information screens installed above doors.

In addition, 1137 was retired in March 2020 in the aftermath of the level crossing crash on 5 September 2019.

Batch 11
Delivered during fiscal 2011.
 8-car set x 1: 1145
 6-car sets x 3: 1301, 1307, 1313

The third six-car set, 1313, entered service on 19 March 2012. This set uses LED interior lighting instead of fluorescent tubes.

Batch 12
Delivered April 2012.
 8-car sets x1: 1153
 6-car sets x2: 1319, 1325

Batch 13
Delivered August 2013 to March 2014.
 8-car sets x1: 1161
 6-car sets x2: 1331, 1337

Batch 14
Delivered in mid to late 2014.
 8-car sets x1: 1169
 6-car sets x3: 1343, 1349, 1355

Batch 15
Delivered in 2015.
 6-car sets x2: 1361, 1367
Set 1367 uses Toshiba-manufactured permanent-magnet synchronous motors.

1000-1800 series
Two new 1000-1800 series four-car sets (1801 and 1805) were delivered from J-TREC in February 2016. These two sets differ from earlier variants in having centre gangways on the cab ends as well as a vinyl-based red and ivory livery.  These two sets entered revenue service on 4 March 2016. In mid 2016, set 1809 was delivered along with Batch 16.

All three sets have stainless steel bodies painted in a red and ivory livery except the side of the doors and windows instead of the vinyl-based livery used on earlier batches.

 4-car sets x3: 1801, 1805, 1809

Batch 16
Introduced in fiscal 2016. These trains inherit the livery used in the 1000-1800 series sets. They use LED lighting throughout, and they are Keikyu's first trains to use LED headlights from new. Internally, the trains feature a combination of longitudinal and transverse seating; each car has two bays of transverse seating, one at each end. The longitudinal seat partitions were enlarged.

 8-car sets x2 from February 2017: 1177, 1185
 6-car sets x2 from November 2016: 1601, 1607

Batch 17
Introduced in fiscal 2017. Starting from this batch, all trains will have stainless steel bodies painted in a red and ivory livery like batch 16, but also including the side of the doors and windows. Internally, pairs of LCD passenger information screens are provided above each set of doors.
 8-car sets x3 from February 2018: 1201, 1209, 1217
 6-car sets x2 from January 2018: 1613, 1619

Batch 18
Introduced in fiscal 2018.
6-car sets x7: 1625, 1631, 1637, 1643, 1649, 1655, 1661

Batch 19
8-car sets x1: 1225
6-car sets x1: 1667

1000-1890 series "Le Ciel" 

The 1000-1890 series 4-car sets were introduced into service from 6 May 2021. These are the first trains in the fleet to feature rotating banks of seats; they can be arranged in a longitudinal or transverse seating configuration when required. The seats are similar to those used on the 2100 series but are  wider. Power sockets are also provided. They are also the first trainsets in the fleet to feature toilets; car 2 features a universal-access Western toilet, and car 3 features a men's toilet. The trains are intended for use on reserved seat "Wing" services as well as chartered event services.

Shortly after their initial entry into service, Keikyu announced that it would procure three additional 4-car sets as part of its investment plan for fiscal 2021. The first of these three sets (1893) entered service on 29 November 2021.

Following a nickname contest for the 1000-1890 series fleet held between June and July 2021, the nickname "Le Ciel" (The Sky in French) was announced for the 1000-1890 series fleet on 24 December. Four entries were given honourable mentions: "Red Rabbit", "Leap", "Sunsun", and "Kofu". From 26 March 2022, the intermediate cars of sets 1891, 1892, 1894, and 1895 were adorned with  branding.

On 26 May 2022, the 1000-1890 series received the Blue Ribbon Award.

 4-car sets x5: 1891, 1892, 1893, 1894, 1895

Formations 
 the fleet consists of 27 eight-car sets (numbered 1001 to 1129, 1145 to 1185, and 1201 to 1225), 24 six-car sets (numbered 1301 to 1367 and 1601 to 1667), and 31 four-car sets (numbered 1401 to 1489, 1801 to 1809, and 1891 to 1895).

8-car sets 1001 to 1033
The five eight-car (aluminium bodied) sets 1001 to 1033 are formed as follows, with four motored (M) cars and four trailer (T) cars.

The "Tpu" and "Tps" cars are each fitted with two single-arm pantographs.

8-car sets 1041 to 1065 
The five eight-car (aluminium bodied) sets 1041 to 1065 are formed as follows, with six motored (M) cars and two trailer (T) cars.

The "Tpu" and "Tps" cars are each fitted with two single-arm pantographs.

8-car sets 1073 to 1185 and 1201 to 1225
The eighteen eight-car (stainless steel bodied) sets 1073 to 1185 and 1201 to 1225 are formed as follows, with six motored (M) cars and two trailer (T) cars.

The "M1u" and "M1s" cars are each fitted with two single-arm pantographs, and the "M1u'" are fitted with one pantograph.

6-car sets 1301 to 1367 and 1601 to 1667
The twenty-four six-car (stainless steel bodied) sets 1301 to 1367 and 1601 to 1667 are formed as follows, with four motored (M) cars and two trailer (T) cars.

On 1301-1367, the "M1u" cars are fitted with one single-arm pantograph, while "M1s" cars are fitted with two single-arm pantographs. On 1601-1667, the "M1u" and "M1s" cars are each fitted with two single-arm pantographs.

4-car sets 1401 and 1405
The first batch of four-car (aluminium bodied) sets, numbered 1401 and 1405, are formed as follows, with two motored (M) cars and two trailer (T) cars.

The "T1pu" and "T1ps" cars are each fitted with one single-arm pantograph.

4-car sets 1409 and 1413
The two four-car (aluminium bodied) sets 1409 and 1413 are formed as follows, with two motored (M) cars and two trailer (T) cars.

The "Tp" cars are fitted with two single-arm pantographs.

4-car sets 1417 to 1445
The eight four-car (aluminium bodied) sets 1417 to 1445 are formed as follows, with three motored (M) cars and one trailer (T) car.

The "Tp" cars are fitted with two single-arm pantographs.

4-car sets 1449 to 1489 and 1801 to 1809
The 16 four-car (stainless steel bodied) sets 1449 to 1489, 1801 to 1809, and 1891 to 1892 are formed as follows, with four motored (M) cars.

The "M1u" and "M1s" cars are each fitted with one single-arm pantograph. The 18xx cars have end gangways that can be connected to form 8-car trains for through service to Asakusa and Keisei Lines.

1000-1890 series 4-car sets 
The 1000-1890 series four-car sets are formed as follows, with two motored (M) cars and two trailer (T) cars. The "Muc2" car is at the Misakiguchi end.

The "Tpsv2" cars are fitted with two single-arm pantographs.

Refurbishment 
On 10 May 2017, Keikyu announced that it would make investments in safety and comfort that would total approximately 21.9 billion yen. Also announced was refurbishment work for eight N1000 series cars. The work includes:

 Modifications to some of the passenger side windows to allow them to be opened
 Removal of roof-mounted exhaust fans
 Enlarged seat partitions
 Replacement of traction equipment
 Replacement of roller-blind destination indicators in favour of full-colour LED destination indicators
Replacement of external and internal lighting with LEDs
Replacement of above-door LED passenger information systems with liquid-crystal display systems
Addition of door opening/closing visual indicators for all passenger doors
Replacement of cooling equipment
Eight-car set 1001, the first set to be treated, returned to service on 18 September 2017.

Livery variations

Haneda Airport Terminal 2 
8-car sets 1025 and 1033 received a sky-blue livery to commemorate the opening of Haneda Airport Terminal 2. They carried this livery until March 2005.

Yellow Happy Train 

8-car set 1057 was repainted into a special "Yellow Happy Train" livery from May 2014, for the collaboration with the private railway operator Seibu Railway. In return, Seibu repainted one of its 9000 series trainsets into Keikyu livery, known as the "Seibu Red Lucky Train". The "Yellow Happy Train" livery was originally intended to be used for about three years; however, due to its popularity, on 27 April 2017, Keikyu announced its decision to keep the livery and to also repaint the passenger doors yellow from their original silver colour.

Accidents
Set 1137 was involved in a collision with a truck on a level crossing near Kanagawa-shimmachi Station on 5 September 2019, killing the truck driver and injured at least 30 others on the train. 

The set was substantially damaged and was withdrawn in March 2020.

References

External links

 Keikyu N1000 series information 
 Kawasaki Heavy Industries product information 
 Siemens order information

Electric multiple units of Japan
N1000 series
Train-related introductions in 2002
Kawasaki multiple units
1500 V DC multiple units of Japan
Tokyu Car multiple units
J-TREC multiple units